Raúl Alejandro Iberbia (born 25 December 1989) is an Argentine footballer who currently plays for Villa San Carlos as a left back.

Iberbia made his football career at Estudiantes de La Plata youth system at a very young age, being promoted to the first–adult team in the 2008 season and debuting in a league game on 17 October of the same year against Gimnasia de Jujuy with Leonardo Astrada as coach. The next year, he was part of team champion of the 2009 Copa Libertadores and also of the team runner–up of the same year's FIFA Club World Cup, lost against Barcelona.

After two seasons, proclaiming champion with his club of the Apertura Tournament, but not playing many games, he received an offer of Chilean Primera División club O'Higgins directed by his former coach Eduardo Berizzo, but however, Iberbia rejected the offer for find most opportunities at La Plata's team.

Honours

Club
Estudiantes de La Plata
 Copa Libertadores (1): 2009
 FIFA Club World Cup (1): 2009 Runner-up
 Primera División Argentina (1): 2010 Apertura

References

External links
 Iberbia at Football Lineups
 

1989 births
Living people
Sportspeople from Buenos Aires Province
Argentine footballers
Argentine expatriate footballers
Estudiantes de La Plata footballers
Coritiba Foot Ball Club players
San Martín de San Juan footballers
Club Atlético Colón footballers
Club Atlético Los Andes footballers
Olimpo footballers
Gimnasia y Esgrima de Mendoza footballers
Club Atlético Villa San Carlos footballers
Argentine Primera División players
Campeonato Brasileiro Série A players
Primera Nacional players
Expatriate footballers in Brazil
Argentine expatriate sportspeople in Brazil
Association football defenders